Rudy Molard (born 17 September 1989) is a French road bicycle racer, who currently rides for UCI WorldTeam .

Career 
He also rode the Tour de France twice, finishing 73rd in 2013. and 51st in 2014.

FDJ (2017–present)

2017 
He had a great form during the spring classics, finishing 8th at La Flèche Wallonne, and 17th at Liège–Bastogne–Liège. He was included in the  team at the 100th Giro d'Italia, and the Tour de France.

2018 
Molard opened his 2018 season off by finishing 3rd overall at both the Tour La Provence, and the Tour du Haut Var. His next race was Paris–Nice, in which he managed to win Stage 6 from Sisteron to Vence. He attacked inside the final kilometer, and managed to get away from the front group. Molard went on to finish 15th overall. He rode the spring classics, and continued his form; he finished 15th at the Amstel Gold Race, 13th at La Flèche Wallonne and 26th at Liège–Bastogne–Liège.

As a preparation for the Tour de France, he rode the Critérium du Dauphiné, and then the French National Road Race Championships, where he finished 6th. His best result during the Tour de France, was 14th on Stage 16. A week after the Tour de France, he finished 11th at Clásica de San Sebastián. At the end of August, he started the Vuelta a España, and managed to get the Leaders Jersey on Stage 5, after being in the breakaway all day. He had the leaders jersey in 4 days before losing it on stage 9.

Major results

2011
 3rd Time trial, National Under-23 Road Championships
 UEC European Under-23 Road Championships
6th Road race
9th Time trial
 10th Time trial, UCI Under-23 Road World Championships
2012
 1st  Mountains classification, Tour de l'Ain
 3rd Overall Tour du Gévaudan Languedoc-Roussillon
2013
 9th Grand Prix de la Ville de Lillers
 10th Overall Tour du Gévaudan Languedoc-Roussillon
2014
 4th Overall Tour de Luxembourg
1st  Young rider classification
 9th Paris–Troyes
2015
 3rd Overall Tour du Limousin
1st Stage 3
 3rd Tour du Doubs
 5th Overall Tour de Luxembourg
 6th La Drôme Classic
 9th Grand Prix de la Somme
 9th Grand Prix de Wallonie
2017
 8th La Flèche Wallonne
2018
 1st Stage 6 Paris–Nice
 3rd Overall Tour La Provence
 3rd Overall Tour du Haut Var
 Vuelta a España
Held  after Stages 5–8
2019
 5th Overall Tour de la Provence
 7th Overall Paris–Nice
 9th Overall Tour du Haut Var
 10th Giro di Lombardia
2020
 7th Overall Paris–Nice
 10th Paris–Tours
2021
 2nd Road race, National Road Championships
 4th Overall Tour des Alpes-Maritimes et du Var
2022
 3rd Overall Tour de l'Ain
 8th Giro di Lombardia
 8th Giro dell'Emilia
 8th La Flèche Wallonne
 9th Tour du Jura
 9th Classic Grand Besançon Doubs
 Vuelta a España
Held  after Stage 5

Grand Tour general classification results timeline

References

External links

1989 births
Living people
French male cyclists
People from Gleizé
Sportspeople from Rhône (department)
Cyclists from Auvergne-Rhône-Alpes